Nisar Ahmad (born 5 August 1995) is a Pakistani cricketer. He made his List A debut on 14 December 2019, for Police Sports Club in the 2019–20 Invitation Limited Over Tournament in Sri Lanka. He made his Twenty20 debut on 4 January 2020, for Police Sports Club in the 2019–20 SLC Twenty20 Tournament. He made his first-class debut on 31 January 2020, for Police Sports Club in Tier B of the 2019–20 Premier League Tournament.

References

External links
 

1995 births
Living people
Pakistani cricketers
Sri Lanka Police Sports Club cricketers